Money Talks is an adult reality game show currently airing on Playboy TV and produced by adult movie studio, Reality Kings.

Format
Based on the existing adult website Reality Kings, Money Talks uses a man on the street format to get women naked on camera. Typical setups include showing the camera a handful of cash and using it to solicit wild stunts, flashing, and sexual activities from patrons off the street.
The show is hosted by Havoc Hailey, although other people have hosted the show on many occasions.

Marketed as an adult version of MTV's Jackass, episodes feature the same female host that appears on the web site and include one R-rated physical stunt, naked shots from women on the street, and a final drawn-out sex act (usually in a business or home), many of which involve relatively unknown or soon-to-be pornstars.

References

External links
Money Talks Playboy TV Site

2000s American game shows
2009 American television series debuts
2009 American television series endings
2014 American television series endings
Television series by Playboy Enterprises
Playboy TV original programming